Darton College may refer to:

 Darton College, Darton, former name of Darton Academy, Darton, South Yorkshire, England
 Darton State College, former name of Albany State University West Campus, Albany, Georgia, United States

See also
 Darton (disambiguation)